James Harlan (August 26, 1820 – October 5, 1899) was an attorney and politician, a member of the United States Senate, a U.S. Cabinet Secretary at the United States Department of Interior under President Andrew Johnson, and a Federal Judge.

Early life
Harlan was born on August 26, 1820 in Clark County, Illinois and raised in Indiana.  He was the son of Silas Harlan (1792–1868) and Mary (née Connolly) Harlan (1796–1896).

As a boy, Harlan attended local schools before graduating from Indiana Asbury University (now DePauw University) in 1845.

Career
In 1845, he moved to Iowa City, Iowa, where he served as Superintendent of Schools.  He also studied law and was admitted to the bar in 1850.  He joined the Whig Party and became active in politics.  In 1850, Harlan declined the Whig nomination for Governor of Iowa.  From 1853 to 1855, Harlan was president of Iowa Wesleyan College in Mount Pleasant, Iowa.

First Senate tenure

In 1855, Harlan was elected by the Iowa legislature to the United States Senate as a Free Soil Party candidate.  In 1857, the U.S. Senate declared the seat vacant because of irregularities in that legislative election. He was re-elected by the legislature and seated as a Republican, serving until 1865.  In 1861, Harlan was a Delegate to the Peace Conference that tried to arrange a compromise to prevent the American Civil War.

Secretary of the Interior
Harlan was a close friend of President Abraham Lincoln and his family.  In 1865, after Lincoln's assassination, he resigned from the Senate when he was appointed as Secretary of the Interior under President Andrew Johnson, an appointment he held until 1866.  As secretary he announced that he intended to "clean house" and fired "a considerable number of incumbents who were seldom at their respective desks". He had done so after requesting, in late May 1865, a report listing all employees who (1.) uttered disloyal statements since the bombardment of Fort Sumter, (2.) all those not known to entertain loyal sentiments or who had associated with those known to be disloyal, (3.) those who were inefficient or not necessary to transact public business, (4.) all such persons "as disregard in their conduct, habits, and associations, the rules of decorum, [and] propriety proscribed by a christian civilization."

Among this group was the poet Walt Whitman, then working as a clerk in the department, who received his dismissal note on June 30, 1865. Harlan had found a copy of Leaves of Grass on Whitman's desk as the poet was making revisions and found it to be morally offensive. "I will not have the author of that book in this Department", he said. "If the President of the United States should order his reinstatement, I would resign sooner than I would put him back." Twenty-nine years later, Harlan defended his firing of Whitman, saying that the clerk was dismissed solely "on the grounds that his services were not needed".

Harlan was a member of the Southern Treaty Commission that renegotiated treaties with Indian Tribes that had sided with the Confederacy, such as the Cherokee and Choctaw.  As part of the new treaties, they had to emancipate their slaves, as was being done by amendment within the United States, and offer them full citizenship in the tribes if they chose to stay in Indian Territory.  If they left, the freedmen would become United States citizens. (Membership issues related to the Cherokee Freedmen and Choctaw Freedmen have become significant since the late 20th century.)  Harlan resigned from the post in 1866 when he no longer supported the policies of President Johnson.

Second Senate tenure
In 1867, he was elected again by the Iowa legislature to the United States Senate and served until the end of his term in January 1873. During his senate service, Harlan was chairman of the committees of Public Lands; District of Columbia; Education; and Indian Affairs.

Later career
Harlan was an unsuccessful candidate for reelection in 1872, and was also an unsuccessful candidate for governor in 1895. After his Senate career ended, Harlan turned a previous house of his into the Harlan House Hotel.

From 1882 to 1886, Harlan was appointed by President Chester A. Arthur as presiding judge for the Court of Commissioners, which heard cases related to the Alabama claims.

Personal life

On November 5, 1845, Harlan was married to Ann Eliza Peck (1824–1884) by President Matthew Simpson, who later became a bishop of the Methodist Episcopal Church.  Ann was the daughter of James Peck and Eunice (née Knight) Peck, both of whom died during Cholera epidemic of 1832. Together, Ann and James were the parents of:

 Mary Eunice Harlan (1846–1937), who married Lincoln's son Robert Todd Lincoln in 1868.  The couple lived during the summers at Harlan's home in Mount Pleasant.
 Silas James Harlan (1850–1850), who died in infancy.
 William Aaron Harlan (1852–1876), who was a close friend of Tad Lincoln.
 Julia Josephine Harlan (1856–1862), who died young.

Harlan died on October 5, 1899 at his hotel in Mount Pleasant, which become his residence in the early 1890s.

Legacy
Harlan's residence, today known as the Harlan-Lincoln House, has been listed on the National Register of Historic Places. Operated as a house museum, it exhibits memorabilia from both the Harlan and Lincoln families.  The Harlan House Hotel is also listed on the National Register of Historic Places.

A commemorative sculpture was done of him; Iowa installed it in the United States Capitol along with one of pioneer Governor Samuel Kirkwood (each state may install two statues for display in the Capitol). The Harlan statue was located in the Hall of Columns until it was replaced in 2014 by a statue of Norman Borlaug.  It is now on display at Iowa Wesleyan College.

The city of Harlan, Iowa in Shelby County was named for him.

References

External links

 
 
 
 Harlan-Lincoln House, Mount Pleasant, Iowa 
 James Harlan, Secretary of the Interior

|-

|-

|-

|-

|-

|-

1820 births
1899 deaths
United States Secretaries of the Interior
People of Iowa in the American Civil War
Union (American Civil War) political leaders
DePauw University alumni
Iowa Whigs
19th-century American politicians
Iowa Republicans
Iowa Free Soilers
Republican Party United States senators from Iowa
Free Soil Party United States senators
Andrew Johnson administration cabinet members
Members of the United States Senate declared not entitled to their seat